Alberto Martijena (15 November 1906 – 5 June 1988) was an Argentine sports shooter. He competed in the 50 metre pistol event at the 1956 Summer Olympics. He also won three silver medals at the Pan American Games.

References

External links
 

1906 births
1988 deaths
Argentine male sport shooters
Olympic shooters of Argentina
Shooters at the 1956 Summer Olympics
Place of birth missing
Pan American Games medalists in shooting
Pan American Games silver medalists for Argentina
Shooters at the 1959 Pan American Games
Medalists at the 1951 Pan American Games
Medalists at the 1955 Pan American Games
Medalists at the 1959 Pan American Games